Mladen Bosić (born 24 May 1961) is a Bosnian Serb politician who was a member of the national House of Peoples from 2019 to 2023. He was previously a member of the national House of Representatives from 2010 to 2018.

In December 2006, Bosić became the new president of the Serb Democratic Party. In October 2016, he resigned as president due to the party's poor performance in the 2016 municipal elections.

References

External links

CIN: Imovina političara Mladena Bosića

1961 births
Living people
People from Brčko District
Serbs of Bosnia and Herzegovina
Politicians of Republika Srpska
Members of the House of Representatives (Bosnia and Herzegovina)
Chairmen of the House of Representatives (Bosnia and Herzegovina)
Members of the House of Peoples of Bosnia and Herzegovina